Klaus Biesenbach (born 1966) is a German American curator and the museum director. He is the Director of the Neue Nationalgalerie, with Berggruen Museum and Scharf-Gerstenberg Collection, as well as the Berlin Museum of Modern Art under construction, Museum des 20. Jahrhunderts.

Previously, he had been serving as the director of The Museum of Contemporary Art, Los Angeles (MOCA), from 2018 to 2021. He is also a former Chief Curator at Large at The Museum of Modern Art in New York City and former director of MoMA PS1. He is also the founding director of Kunst-Werke Institute for Contemporary Art (KW) in Berlin, and the Berlin Biennale.

Early life 
Biesenbach was born in 1966, in Bergisch Gladbach, West Germany. From 1987, he began studying medicine in Munich. He moved to Berlin in the mid-1990s, where he shared an apartment with artist Andrea Zittel at one point.

Career

Kunst-Werke Institute for Contemporary Art 
Biesenbach founded Kunst-Werke Institute for Contemporary Art (KW) in Berlin in 1991, as well as the Berlin Biennale in 1996, and remains Founding Director of both entities. Under his artistic and executive directorship, KW and the Berlin Biennale were started as self-inventive initiatives and are now federally and state funded institutions.

MoMA, and MOMA PS1 
Biesenbach joined MoMA PS1 as a curator in 1996; the museum's director Alanna Heiss had hired him part-time while allowing him to maintain his directorship in Berlin. Working with Heiss, he created the "Warm Up" outdoor summer series of live music and helped found the "Greater New York" exhibition series, which showcases emerging talent in the metropolitan area.

In 2004, Biesenbach was appointed as a curator in the MoMA's "Department of Film and Media". He was named Chief Curator of MoMA's newly formed Department of Media, in 2006; it was the first new curatorial department since photography, in 1940. By 2009, it was subsequently broadened to the Department of Media and Performance Art to reflect the Museum's increased focus on collecting, preserving, and exhibiting performance art. As Chief Curator of the department, Biesenbach led a range of pioneering initiatives, including the launch of a new performance art exhibition series; an ongoing series of workshops for artists and curators; acquisitions of media and performance art; and the Museum's presentation in 2010 of a major retrospective of the work of Marina Abramović.

In 2012, Biesenbach turned MoMA P.S. 1 into a temporary day shelter for displaced residents after Hurricane Sandy. He drafted an open letter to the then New York City Mayor, Michael R. Bloomberg and fellow New Yorkers that called for help in the Rockaways, signed by celebrities including Lady Gaga, Madonna, James Franco, Gwyneth Paltrow and Patti Smith.

In addition to his role at MoMA, Biesenbach served as member of the International Jury at the Venice Biennale (1997) and as co-curator of the Berlin Biennale (1998) and 2002 Shanghai Biennale (2002).

MOCA 
In 2018, Biesenbach was appointed director of the Museum of Contemporary Art, Los Angeles.

During his time as director, Biesenbach introduced free admission to the museum with a $10 million gift from Carolyn Clark Powers, founded the first Environmental Council at any American museum and started the Performance Space Wonmi's Warehouse Programs while commissioning Larry Bell's, Bill and Coo and Untitled by Barbara Kruger as public art projects.

As part of a 2021 reorganization, Biesenbach was later named artistic director, with a mandate to focus on setting the artistic vision for the museum, overseeing exhibitions and collections. Shortly after, Johanna Burton was appointed as executive director.

Neue Nationalgalerie 
In September 2021, Biesenbach was appointed as new director of both the Neue Nationalgalerie with Berggruen Museum and Scharf-Gerstenberg Collection and the future Museum of the 20th Century.

Other activities 
 American Academy in Berlin, Member of the Board of Trustees
 Berlin Biennale, Member of the Advisory Board
 KW Institute for Contemporary Art, Member of the Board

Recognition 
In 2021, Biesenbach was awarded an Honorary Doctor of Fine Arts by the New York Academy of Art.

In 2016, Biesenbach was awarded the Order of Merit of the Federal Republic of Germany.

In 2018 he received the City of New York Proclamation of Honor for service to New York City.

Biesenbach received the International Association of Art Critics (AICA) award for the exhibitions Marina Abramović: The Artist Is Present, Pipilotti Rist: Pour Your Body Out (7354 Cubic Meters), and Fassbinder: Berlin Alexanderplatz. He also received AICA awards for co-curating the exhibitions Kenneth Anger, 100 Years (version #2, ps1, nov 2009), and Roth Time: A Dieter Roth Retrospective and 100 Years (version #2 PS1, Nov 2009) at MoMA PS1 and MoMA QNS, as well as Kenneth Anger (2009) at MoMA PS1 and 100 Years (version #2 PS1, Nov 2009) at MoMA PS1 and MoMA QNS, as well as Kenneth Anger (2009) at MoMA PS1.

Exhibitions 

As Director at MOCA, Los Angeles, Klaus Biesenbach introduced free admission to the museum, founded the first Environmental Council at any American museum and started the Performance Space Wonmi's Warehouse Programs while commissioning Larry Bell's, Bill and Coo and Untitled by Barbara Kruger as public art projects.

As director he diversified the collection and exhibition program by supporting exhibitions with artists like Xu Zhen, Jennifer Packer, Pipilotti Rist, Henry Taylor, Tala Madani, Judy Baca, Annika Yi, Garrett Bradley, Cao Fei, and Simone Forti.

During Covid he pivoted the museum programs online to virtual MOCA where he conducted twenty-five studio visits with international artists that were distributed on the museum's website, social media, and YouTube. In addition he fundraised with artists' designed facemasks by Yoko Ono, Catherine Opie, Pipilotti Rist, Mark Grotjahn, Barbara Kruger, Hank Willis Thomas, Virgil Abloh, Alex Israel and sold them internationally in collaboration with the Warhol Foundation, the Qatar Museums and  the K11 Hongkong.

Exhibitions organized and co-organized by Biesenbach at Neue Nationalgalerie 

 Monica Bonvicini: I do you (2022)
 Allora & Calzadilla, Stop, Repair, Prepare: Variations on "Ode to Joy" for a Prepared Piano (2022)
 Simone Forti: Huddle (2022)
 A Day in Greenery: The Kulturforum Gardens Programme (2022)
 »Sound in the Garden«, series of concerts initiated by Klaus Biesenbach (2022)
 Barbara Kruger: Bitte lachen / Please cry (2022)
 Maria Kulikovska: »254«, Performance (2022)
 Anne Teresa De Keersmaeker: Rosas. Dark Red (2022)
 Our Space to Help: Fundraiser at the Neue Nationalgalerie, initiated by Klaus Biesenbach, in collaboration with Anne Imhof and Olafur Eliasson (2022)

Exhibitions organized and co-organized by Biesenbach at MoMA 
 The Modern Window: Firelei Báez, MoMA (2018–2019)
 Unfinished Conversations: New Work from the Collection, co-organized (2017)
 Xaviera Simmons: The Gold Miner's Mission to Dwell on the Tide Line (Dez 2015 – May 2017)
 Teiji Furuhashi: Lovers, co-organized (2016)
 Nan Goldin: The Ballad of Sexual Dependency (2016)
 Yoko Ono: One Woman Show, 1960–1971 (2015)
 Björk (2015)
 Antony and the Johnsons: Swanlights with Symphony Orchestra, commissioned by MoMA and performed at Radio City Music Hall (2012)
 Kraftwerk – Retrospective 1 2 3 4 5 6 7 8 (2012)
 Francis Alÿs: A Story of Deception (2011)
 Andy Warhol: Motion Pictures (2010)
 Marina Abramović: The Artist is Present (2010)
 William Kentridge: Five Themes, co-organized (2010)
 Tehching Hsieh: Performance 1 (2009)
 Roman Ondák: Performance 4 (2009)
 Pipilotti Rist: Pour Your Body Out (7354 Cubic Meters) (2008)
 Olafur Eliasson: Take your time. co-curated with Roxana Marcoci, Curator, Department of Photography (2008)
 Sigalit Landau: Projects 87 (2008)
 Abbas Kiarostami: Image Maker (2007)
 Doug Aitken: Sleepwalkers, co-commissioned with Creative Time (2007)
 Douglas Gordon: Timeline (2006)
 Take Two. Worlds and Views: Contemporary Art from the Collection, co-organized with Roxana Marcoci (2005)
 New Works/ New Acquisitions, co-organized with Ann Temkin (2004)

Exhibitions organized and co-organized by Biesenbach at MoMA PS1 
 Rockaway! Narcissus Garden by Yayoi Kusama (2018)
 Elle Pérez: Diabolo (2018)
 Walter Price: New Paintings (2018)
 Reza Abdoh, co-organized (2018)
 Land: Zhang Huan and Li Binyuan (2018)
 Michael E Smith (2017)
 Alvaro Barrington (Painting Studio) (2017)
 Stanya Kahn: Stand in the Stream (2017)
 Vito Acconci: Where We Are Now (Who Are We Anyway?) (2016)
 Cao Fei (2016)
 Katharina Grosse: Rockaway!, painted house on the ocean (2016)
 Wael Shawky: Cabaret Crusades (2015)
 Björk's Stonemilker by Andrew Thomas Huang (2015)
 Halil Altindere: Wonderland (2015)
 Korakrit Arunanondchai (2014)
 Christoph Schlingensief, co-organized (2014)
 Rockaway Projekte with Patti Smith, Janet Cardiff, Adrián Villar Rojas in Rockaway Beach (2014)
 Francesco Vezzoli: Teatro Romano (2014)
 Zero Tolerance (2014)
 Jeff Elrod: Nobody Sees Like Us (2013)
 Cyprien Gaillard: The Crystal World (2013)
 Kraftwerk – Retrospective 1 2 3 4 5 6 7 8 (2012)
 Max Brand: no solid footing – (trained) duck fighting a crow (2012)
 Ferhat Özgür: I Can Sing (2012)
 Ryan Trecartin: Any Ever, co-organized (2011)
 Rania Stephan (2011)
 Jeremy Shaw: Best Minds (2011)
 Francis Alÿs (2011)
 Laurel Nakadate (2011)
 Feng Mengbo (2010)
 On-Site 3: Mickalene Thomas (2010)
 Greater New York, co-organized (2010)
 Mickalene Thomas: Le Déjeuner Sur L'herbe: Les Trois Femmes Noires (2010)
 100 Years (version #2, PS1, Nov. 2009)
 Jonathan Horowitz: And/Or (2009)
 Michael Joaquin Grey (2009)
 Kenneth Anger, co-organized with Susanne Pfeffer (2009)
 Fassbinder: Berlin Alexanderplatz (2007)
 Mark Lewis: Northumberland (2007)
 Abbas Kiarostami: Image Maker (2007)
 Into Me/Out of Me (2006)
 Johannes Van Der Beek, part of group show "Special Projects" (2005)
 Greater New York, co-organized (2005)
 Hard Light, co-organized with Doug Aitken (2004)
 Hedi Slimane: Berlin (2003)
 Taryn Simon: The Innocents (2003)
 First Steps, emerging artists from Japan (2003)
 Chris Cunningham (2002)
 Mexico City: An Exhibition About the Exchange Rate of Bodies and Values (2002)
 Single Channel Works from the Collections of Pamela and Richard Kramlich and New Art Trust, organized with Christopher Eamon and Barbara London (2002)
 Loop – Alles auf Anfang (2001–2002)
 Henry Darger, Disasters of War (2001)
 Kimsooja (2001)
 Special Mission Project ko2: Takashi Murakami (2001)
 Takashi Murakami: Transformer (2000)
 Disasters of War (2000)
 Greater New York, ko-organisiert (2000)
 Children of Berlin (1999–2000)
 The Promise of Photography, a selection of the photographic collection of the DZ Bank (1999)
 Generation Z, co-organized (1999)
 MoMA PS1 opening exhibition co-curated with Alanna Heiss, Michael Tarantino and Kazue Kobata (1997)

Exhibitions organized and co-organized by Biesenbach at KW Institute for Contemporary Art 
 Ryan Trecartin, Site Visit, co-organized (2014)
 Christoph Schlingensief, co-organized (2013)
 Political/Minimal (2008)
 Fassbinder: Berlin Alexanderplatz (2007)
 Taryn Simon: The Innocents (2004)
 Hedi Slimane: Berlin (2003)
 Mexico City: An Exhibition about the Exchange Rates of Bodies and Values (2002)
 Francis Alÿs - Alejandro González Iñárritu (2002)
 Jane & Louise Wilson, installation of the British artist duo, co-organized (2002)
 Heike Baranowsky, first solo survey of media-based works (2001)
 Henry Darger, Disasters of War (2001)
 Takashi Murakami: Special Mission Project ko2 (2001)
 Christoph Keller: Encyclopaedia Cinematographica, co-organized (2001)
 Doug Aitken: I am in you, solo exhibition in collaboration with Kunstmuseum Wolfsburg, co-organized (2001)
 Abbas Kiarostami, selection of photographs of the Iranian filmmaker (2001)
 Ulrike Ottinger, Abbas Kiarostami (2001)
 Never Mind the Nineties, a lecture series including Rirkrit Tiravanija, Douglas Gordon, Gabriel Orozco, Christine Borland, Pipilotti Rist, Jake and Dinos Chapman, Angela Bulloch, and Tobias Rehberger; Artclub, co-organized with Katharina Sieverding (2000)
 Jonathan Meese, Performance and solo presentation (2000)
 Ghada Amer, New Paintings (2000)
 Santiago Sierra, first German solo exhibition (2000)
 Nic Hess: Dolly II (2000)
 Jordan Crandall: Drive, Track 1 (2000)
 Sencer Vardarman: Corridors (2000)
 John Isaacs: A Necessary Change of Heart (2000)
 Erik Steinbrecher: Couch Park (2000)
 Francisco de Goya: Desastres de la Guerra (2000)
 Dinos und Jake Chapman: What the hell I-X (2000)
 Paul Pfeiffer, first European solo exhibition (2000)
 Mick O'Shea, site specific installation (2000)
 Lara Schnitger, first German solo exhibition (2000)
 Piotr Uklanski: Die Nazis (2000)
 Matthew Barney: Cremaster 2 (2000)
 Warten (1999)
 Exhibitions for the Re-Opening of Kunst-Werke (1999)
 Sommeraccrochage (1999)
 Tony Oursler: Frozen (1999)
 Joachim Koester: Untitled (La Nuit Americaine) (1999)
 Eija Liisa Ahtila: ME/WE; OKAY; GRAY (1999)
 Woodland: Susanne Gertud Kriemann, co-organized (1999)
 Dan Graham: Pavilions (1999)
 Construction Drawings (1999)
 Elke Krystufek: I am your mirror (1999)
 Café Bravo, a pavilion designed by Dan Graham for the courtyard of the KW (1998)
 Gunda Förster, site-specific illumination of Kunst-Werke (1996)
 Preparation of the 1. berlin biennial for contemporary art (1996)
 Bodo Schlack, new paintings (1996)
 Christine Borland: From life (1996)
 Katrin Hoffert, first solo exhibition (1995)
 Hannes Rickli: Kugel (1995)
 Sonnenstunden – Das Bankprojekt, 3 Jahre Vera Bourgeois (1995)
 Jürgen Albrecht, first solo exhibition, co-organized (1995)
 Vito Acconci: The Red Tapes (1995)
 Bruce Nauman: Changing Light Corridor with Rooms (1995)
 Jutta Koether: DÉBORDEMENT (1995)
 Ulrike Grossarth: Reste vom Mehrwert (1995)
 Paul Armand Gette, site specific installation (1995)
 Matthias Hoch: new photography (1995)
 Christine Hill, first solo exhibition (1995)
 Inez van Laamsweerde/Judy Fox, sculpture and photography curated with Katrin Becker (1995)
 Spiral Jetty – Hotel Palenque, installations by Robert Smithson (1994)
 Joseph Kosuth: Berlin Chronicle, a Temporary Media Monument for Walter Benjamin (1994)
 Tony Oursler: Horror (1994)
 Oniscus murarius: Constantino Ciervo, Ottmar Kiefer and Ampelio Zappalorto (1994)
 Günter Unterburger, presentation of new sculptures (1994)
 Monica Bonvicini: Die Ecken des Lebens oder über eine perspektivische Architektur der Wahrheit (1994)
 Kunst: Sprache, group exhibition, co-organized (1994)
 Tony Oursler: White Trash (1993)
 Douglas Gordon: 24-h-Psycho (1993)
 Sabine Hornig: Ateliereinbau II, co-organized (1993)
 Milovan Markovic: Privat (1993)
 KW studios 92/93 with Fritz Balthaus, Alyssa de Lucia, Gero Gries, Ulrike Grossarth, Sabine Hornig, Günther Underburger (1993–1992)
 Getrennte Welten – with Nan Goldin and Gundula Schulze-Eldowy (1992)
 37 Räume (1992)
 Sans Frontieres: an Art in Ruins installation by Glyn Banks and Hannah Vowles with support of DAAD (1992)
 Ankunft: Valie Export, Leiko Ikemura, Christina Kubisch, Christiane Möbus, Maria Vedder, Joan Jonas and Aura Rosenberg (1992)
 Peter Moors, Andreas Rost, new works (1991)

Additional solo and group exhibitions organized and co-organized by Biesenbach 
 ..com/.cn, K11, Shanghai, traveled to K11, Hong Kong (2017–18)
 Procesion Migracion con Papo Colo as an Ecology Procession through the rain forest in Puerto Rico (2016)
 15 Rooms, with Hans Ulrich Obrist at Long Museum, Shanghai (2014)
 14 Rooms, with Hans Ulrich Obrist at Bayeler Fondation, Basel (2014)
 13 Rooms, with Hans Ulrich Obrist at Kaldor Public Art Projects, Sydney (2013)
 12 Rooms, with Hans Ulrich Obrist at Museum Folkwang, Essen (2012)
 11 Rooms, with Hans Ulrich Obrist at Manchester Art Gallery (2011)
 Regarding Terror: The Red Army Faction-Exhibition, Berlin and Graz, co-organized (2005)
 Andy Warhol, Moving Pictures, Museum of Modern Art, Rio de Janeiro, MALBA Buenos Aires (2004/2005)
 Francis Alÿs, Martin-Gropius-Bau, Berlin (2004)
 The Ten Commandments, a large-scale group show with 63 international artists, Deutsches Hygienemuseum Dresden (2004)
 First Steps, emerging artists from Japan, Tokyo Convention Center, co-organized (2001)
 Shanghai Biennale, co-organized (2002)
 Loop - Alles auf Anfang, Kunsthalle of the Hypo-Kulturstiftung, Munich and Cincinnati (2001– 2002)
 Henry Darger, Disasters of War, Migros Museum, Zurich; Watari-Um, The Watari Museum of Contemporary Art, Tokyo; Magazin 3, Stockholm Konsthall (2001)
 Site Construction with Monica Bonvicini, Thomas Demand, Manfred Pernice, Jonathan Meese, South London Gallery (1998)
 1.Berlin Biennale for contemporary art, co-organized (1998)
 Hybrid Workspace bei der Documenta X, Kassel, co-organized (1997)
 Nach Weimar, Weimar, co-organized (1996)
 Projected Images: Venice Biennale (1995)
 Club Berlin, Venice Biennale (1995)
 Deutschland wird Deutscher, a project throughout Berlin organized in collaboration with Katharina Sieverding and UdK (1993)
 Christo vor der Verhüllung, Marstall Berlin with Gabriele Muschter (1993)
 Dialog im Bode Museum mit Isa Genzken, Klaus vom Bruch, Svetlana und Igor Kopystiansky, Strawalde, Staatliche Museen Preussischer Kulturbesitz, Bode-Museum Berlin (1992)
 Installation by Kumiko Shimizu, Elisabethkirche, Berlin, co-organized (1991)

Publications

Selected digital content for MOCA 
25 Virtual Studio Visits

Season 1 
 Marina Abramović (June 2020)
 Hank Willis Thomas (June 2020)
 Elizabeth Peyton (May 2020)
 Olafur Eliasson (May 2020)
 Camille Henrot (March 2020)
 Arthur Jafa (May 2020)
 Katharina Grosse (May 2020)
 Marilyn Minter (May 2020)
 Nancy Rubens (May 2020)
 Anicka Yi (April 2020)
 Mark Grotjahn (April 2020)
 Catherine Opie (April 2020)
 Mary Weatherford (April 2020)
 Shirin Neshat (April 2020)
 Korakrit Arunanondchai (April 2020)

Season 2 
 Sarah Sze (March 2021)
 Doris Salcedo (Feb. 2021)
 Doug Aitken (Feb. 2021)
 William Kentridge (Feb. 2021)
 Simone Forti (Jan. 2021)
 Mickalene Thomas (Dec. 2020)
 Jeff Koons (unreleased) (Nov. 2020)
 Tomás Saraceno (Oct. 2020)
 Huma Bhabha (Oct. 2020)
 Pipilotti Rist (Sep. 2020)

Selected publications

2021 

 Klaus Biesenbach, co-editor, 30 Years KW Berlin: A History, Berlin: Kunst-Werke.

2019 
 Klaus Biesenbach and Bettina Funcke, MoMA PS1: A History. New York: Museum of Modern Art. ISBN 978-1-63345-069-1

2015 
 Klaus Biesenbach and Christophe Cherix, Yoko Ono: One Woman Show, 1960-1971. New York: Museum of Modern Art. ISBN 9780870709661
 Klaus Biesenbach et al., Björk: Mid-Career Retrospective With New Commissioned Pieces for MoMA. New York: Museum of Modern Art. ISBN 9780870709609

2014 
 Klaus Biesenbach et al., 14 Rooms. Ostfildern: Hatje Cantz. ISBN 978-3-7757-3915-3

2013 
 Klaus Biesenbach et al., Christoph Schlingensief. London: Koenig Books. ISBN 3863354958

2010 
 Klaus Biesenbach, Neville Wakefield and Cornelia Butler: Greater New York 2010. New York: MoMA PS1, 2010. 
 Klaus Biesenbach, Agustin Perez Rubio, Beatrix Ruf and Ugo Rondinone: The Night of Lead: Ugo Rondinone. Edited by Beatrix Ruf, Osterlilden: Hatje Cantz, 2010. 
 Klaus Biesenbach and Mark Godfrey (Ed.): A Story of Deception: Francis Alÿs. New York: The Museum of Modern Art, 2009.

2009 
 Klaus Biesenbach (Ed.): The Artist is Present: Marina Abramović. New York: The Museum of Modern Art, 2009. 
 Klaus Biesenbach: Henry Darger. München/New York: Prestel, 2009. 
 Klaus  Biesenbach, Michael Aupingen, Carolyn Christov-Bakargiev, Cornelia H. Butler, Judith B. Hecker and William Kentridge: Five Themes: William Kentridge. Edited by Mark Rosenthal, San Francisco Museum of Modern Art, 2009. 
 Klaus Biesenbach, Kelly Taylor and Jonathan Horowitz: And/Or. Edited by Lionel Bovier, Zürich: JRP Ringer, 2009. 
 Klaus Biesennbach (Ed.): Political, Minimal. Nürnberg: Verlag für moderne Kunst, 2009.

2008 
 Klaus Biesenbach, Marina Abramović, Chrissie Iles and Kristine Stiles: Marina Abramović. New York: Phaidon, 2008. 
 Klaus Biesenbach, Daniel Birnbaum, Jenny Dirksen, Philipp Fürnkäs, Kaye Geipel and Ulrike Groos: Julia Stoschek Collection Number One: Destroy, she said. Osterfilden: Hatje Cantz, 2008.

2007 
 Klaus Biesenbach, Peter Eleey, Glenn Lowry and Doug Aitken: Sleepwalkers: Doug Aitken. New York: The Museum of Modern Art, 2007. 
 Klaus Biesenbach: Rainer Werner Fassbinder: Berlin Alexanderplatz. Berlin: KW Institute for Contemporary Art, 2007. 
 Klaus Biesenbach, Georges Bataille and Susan Sontag: Into Me / Out of Me. Edited by Klaus Biesenbach, Ostfilden: Hatje Cantz 2007. 
 Klaus Biesenbach: In Bildern denken – Kunst, Medien und Ethik: Ist die Kunst den Medien noch gewachsen?. Regensburg: Lindinger + Schmid Kunstprojekte und Verlag, 2007.

2006 
 Klaus Biesenbach (Ed.): Timeline: Douglas Gordon. New York: The Museum of Modern Art, 2006.

2005 
 Klaus Biesenbach and Alanna Heiss (Ed.): Close-Ups: Katharina Sieverding. Berlin: KW Institute for Contemporary Art, 2005. 
 Klaus Biesenbach, Alanna Heiss and Anthony Huberman (Ed.): Animations. New York: P.S.1 Contemporary Art Center, 2003. 
 Klaus Biesenbach, Mary Lea Bandy and Laurence Kardish (Ed.): Motion Pictures: Andy Warhol. Berlin: KW Institute for Contemporary Art, 2005. 
 Klaus Biesenbach (Ed.): Greater New York 2005. New York: P.S.1 Contemporary Art Center 2005. 
 Klaus Biesenbach and Matthew Monahan: Fragile Kingdom: Lara Schniger. Amsterdam: Artimo, 2005. 
 Klaus Biesenbach, Vanessa Adler, Ellen Blumenstein and Felix Ensslin (Ed.): Zur Vorstellung des Terror: RAF. Göttingen: Steidl, 2005.

2004 
 Klaus Biesenbach (Ed.): Disasters of War: Henry Darger. Berlin: KW Institute for Contemporary Art, 2004. 
 Klaus Biesenbach (Ed.): Die Zehn Gebote. Osterfilden: Hatje Cantz,  2004.

2003 
 Klaus Biesenbach and Alanna Heiss (Ed.): Video Acts. New York: P.S.1 Contemporary Art Center, 2003. 
 Klaus Biesenbach, Alanna Heiss and Anthony Huber (Ed.): Mexico City. New York: P.S.1 Contemporary Art Center, 2003.

2001 
 Klaus Biesenbach (Ed.): Loop  - Alles auf Anfang. New York: Klaus Biesenbach for P.S. 1 / MoMA, 2001.
 Klaus Biesenbach (Ed.): KW Magazine #02/01 Special Issue Mediarealities. Berlin: KW Institute for Contemporary Art, 2001.
 Klaus Biesenbach (Ed.): KW Magazine #01/01. Berlin: KW Institute for Contemporary Art, 2001.

1997 
 Klaus Biesenbach and Emma Dexter: Chapmanworld. London: ICA London, Berlin: KW Institute for Contemporary Art, 1997.
 Klaus Biesenbach and Ulrike Grossarth: Reste vom Mehrwert: Ulrike Grossarth. Berlin: KW Institute for Contemporary Art, 1997.

1996 
 Klaus Biesenbach and Nicolas Schafhausen (Ed.): Nach Weimar. Osterfilden: Hatje Cantz, 1996.

1994 
 Klaus Biesenbach, Christine Hill and Barbara Steiner: Christine Hill. Berlin: Eigen+Art/ KW Institute for Contemporary Art, 1995.
 Klaus Biesenbach and Harald Fricke (Ed.): Joseph Kosuth. Berlin Chronicle – A Temporary Media Monument for Walter Benjamin. Berlin: KW Institute for Contemporary Art, 1994.

1992 
 Klaus Biesenbach (Ed.): Berlin 37 Räume. Berlin: KW Institute for Contemporary Art, 1992.

Selected recent contributions

2018 
 Klaus Biesenbach, "We Had to Create Something New': Klaus Biesenbach on Inventing the Berlin Biennale," ARTNews, June 7, 2018
 Klaus Biesenbach, "In Puerto Rico, Artists Rebuild and Reach Out," The New York Times, January 25, 2018

2016 
 "Klaus Biesenbach Recalls the Founding of KW in Berlin 25 Years Ago, a Moment of 'Radical Change and Freedom'," ARTNews, Nov. 25, 2016

Klaus Biesenbach has also contributed texts to exhibition catalogs as well as edited volumes, and he has published articles in art journals, including Art & Australia, Artforum International, and Flash Art International. He wrote the monthly column "Erdkunde" for the German art magazine Monopol.

References 

Living people
American art curators
German art historians
German expatriates in the United States
People associated with the Museum of Modern Art (New York City)
People from Bergisch Gladbach
German male non-fiction writers
German curators
Recipients of the Cross of the Order of Merit of the Federal Republic of Germany
1966 births